Viracochapampa, Huiracochapampa, or Wiracochapampa (possibly from Quechua wiraqucha: mister, sir, gentleman, god; or Wiracocha: one of the greatest Andean divinities; and pampa: plain) is an archaeological site with the remains of a building complex of ancient Peru of pre-Inca times. It was one of the administrative centers of the Wari culture.

Chronology
The site was occupied from the late Middle Horizon 1B time to the first decades of period 2A, according to the chronology established by Dorothy Menzel, taking as reference the classic division of Horizons and Intermediate by John Rowe. These correspond to the 7th and 8th centuries of our era.

See also
Marcahuamachuco
Chimu
Mochica
Trujillo

References

Further reading

 Denise Pozzi–Escot Buenano: Historia del Perú III. El Perú Antiguo III (500-1400) El Horizonte Medio y los estados regionales, Empresa Editora El Comercio S.A., Lima, 2010. 
 Kauffmann Doig, Federico: Historia y arte del Perú antiguo. Tomo 3. Lima, Ediciones PEISA, 2002. 
 Lumbreras, Luis Guillermo: “El Imperio Wari”. Incluido en Historia del Perú. Tomo II. Perú Antiguo. Lima, Editorial Juan Mejía Baca, 1980.
 Makowski, Krzysztof: "Primeras civilizaciones," Enciclopedia Temática del Perú, Tomo 2. Lima, Empresa Editora “El Comercio” S.A., 2004. 
 Santillana, Julián I.: «Los estados panandinos: Wari y Tiwanaku». Incluida en Historia del Perú. Lexus Editores. Barcelona, 2000. 
 Tauro del Pino, Alberto: Enciclopedia Ilustrada del Perú,Tercera Edición. Tomo 17. VAC/ZUZ.  Lima, PEISA, 2001. 

Archaeology of Peru
Archaeological cultures of South America
Andean civilizations
Archaeological sites in La Libertad Region
Archaeological sites in Peru
Wari culture